AS Dauphins Noirs (Black Dolphins) is a football club from DR Congo. They play their home games at Stade des Volcans, which has a capacity of 10,000. The stadium is located in Goma.

References

External links
Club logo

Football clubs in the Democratic Republic of the Congo
Sports clubs in the Democratic Republic of the Congo
Goma